The High Arctic Large Igneous Province (HALIP) is a Cretaceous large igneous province in the Arctic. The region is divided into several smaller magmatic provinces. Svalbard, Franz Josef Land, Sverdrup Basin, Amerasian Basin, and northern Greenland (Peary Land) are some of the larger divisions. However, eroded volcanic sediments in sedimentary strata in Svalbard and Franz Josef Land suggest that an extremely large portion of HALIP volcanics have already been eroded away.

Geologic evolution
The HALIP event lasted from 130 million years ago to approximately 60 million years ago. During its active period, there were two distinct phases of volcanism. The first phase lasted from 130 million years ago to 80 million years ago and was characterized by tholeiitic igneous activity. During this time, numerous dikes and sills formed, and there were eruptions of basaltic flow. The basalts formed at this time are relatively rich in TiO2 and have a similar composition to continental flood basalts. The second phase lasted from approximately 85 million years ago to 60 million years ago and was characterized by mildly alkaline igneous activity and the eruption of flood basalts. The igneous rocks formed during the second phase have a similar geochemical makeup as the intra-plate composition.

The Arctic Ocean is a few hundred million years old, making it the youngest ocean on Earth.  In the Precambrian, when the Arctic was located south of the Equator, the continent Arctica (or Arctida) filled the gap between the cratons that today surround the Arctic region.  Arctica rifted apart in the Late Precambrian (950 Ma) and was reassembled in a new configuration in the Late Paleozoic (255 Ma).

During the Jurassic-Cretaceous this second continent, known as Pangea, broke apart, opening the Amerasian Basin and the Arctic Ocean.  HALIP dispersed the components of this second continent around the margins of the Arctic Ocean where they are now terranes and microplates embedded into fold belts or overlain by sediments. As the Atlantic and Arctic oceans opened during the Mesozoic and into the Cenozoic, the Arctic Region underwent several stages of rifting, sedimentation, and magmatism.

Dolerites collected from Svalbard and elsewhere in the Arctic are mafic intra-plate tholeiites characteristic of HALIP, which indicated that the LIP formed during the opening of the Arctic Ocean around 148–70 Ma.  Seismic and magnetic analyses of the seafloor produced ages of 118–83 Ma.

The HALIP is widely thought to have originated from a mantle plume, and the igneous activity of the province often tracked along a similar path as the Icelandic hotspot.

Magmatic provinces 
The HALIP is divided into several magmatic provinces. These provinces are divided by location, igneous rock composition, and the formations present.

Svalbard 
In the Svalbard province, the HALIP is expressed as an extensive system of alkaline intrusive doleritic rocks. The basaltic rocks found in Svalbard have an intra-plate composition and are thought to originate from a source near the Alpha Ridge. The Svalbard province is also closely associated with the Franz Josef Land province (discussed below).

Franz Josef Land 
The Franz Josef Land province is closely associated with the Svalbard province. However, the archipelago is scattered with a prominent swarm of southeast trending dikes. Extensive sills and volcanic flows can also be found in the region, as well as a few dikes of other trends. The timing of the Franz Josef Land formations and the Svalbard formations is thought to be nearly identical, furthering the evidence for a large initial plume head model for the HALIP.

Sverdrup Basin 

The Sverdrup Basin province spreads across the Canadian Arctic Islands. The region is characterized by the presence of a radiating dike swarm across the Queen Elizabeth Islands that seems to suggest the presence of a mantle plume beneath the Alpha Ridge. This province contains igneous rocks of both tholeiitic and alkaline composition. There are also a respectable number of sills and flood basalts in the province. The flood basalts in the Canadian Arctic Islands are similar to those of the Columbia River flood basalts in the Pacific Northwest of the United States.

Amerasian Basin 
The Amerasian Basin's most prominent feature is the Alpha Ridge – which is thought to be the location of the mantle plume that fed the HALIP. Also in the region are a few basaltic dikes.

Northern Greenland (Peary Land) 
The northern Greenland province, also known as Peary Land, contains three dike swarms. The Nansen Land swarm trends SSE-SE and is the oldest of the swarms. The middle-aged swarm is known as the Erlandsen Swarm and trends SE-ESE. The J. P. Koch Swarm is the youngest of the three and trends eastward. The two younger swarms tend to have igneous rocks of alkaline composition, while the Nansen Land swarm tends to have more tholeiitic composition.

Barents Sea 
The Barents Sea province is characterized by igneous intrusions with much similarity to Svalbard and Franz-Josef Land. This region is well known for being petroleum-rich.

Climatic impact
Large igneous provinces such as HALIP are thought to have caused global climate change.

The BLIP intrusions could have released perhaps  of carbon from the contact aureoles which could have triggered the Aptian oceanic anoxic event (OAE1a) at 120 Ma.

See also
 Volcanism of Canada
 Volcanism of Northern Canada

References

Notes

Sources

 
 
 
 
 
 
 

 
 
 
 
 
 
 

Large igneous provinces
Cretaceous volcanism
Geography of the Arctic
Volcanism of Nunavut
Volcanism of the Arctic Ocean
Volcanism of Norway
Volcanism of Russia
Prehistory of the Arctic
Geology of the Arctic
Geology of the Arctic Ocean
Geology of Russia
Cretaceous Europe
Cretaceous North America
Cretaceous Canada
Cretaceous Norway